The Biz Never Sleeps is the second studio album by Biz Markie. It was released on October 10, 1989, on Cold Chillin'/Warner Bros. Records and was produced by Biz, his cousin Cool V and producer Paul C, instead of Cold Chillin' in-house producer Marley Marl. The album proved to be a success, peaking at #66 on the Billboard 200 and #9 on the Top R&B/Hip-Hop Albums, as well as producing his most famous song and biggest hit, "Just a Friend," which made it to #9 on the Billboard Hot 100 and #5 on the Hot Rap Singles.

The album was certified gold by the RIAA on April 24, 1990.

"She's Not Just Another Woman (Monique)" samples 8th Day's song "She's Not Just Another Woman".

A video for the track "Spring Again" was released in the spring of 1990. 

A 2006 Japanese issue includes song "A Thing Named Kim" as track 8.

Though out of print for many years, the album was reissued on LP and CD in 2012 by Traffic Entertainment Group.

The release has received praise both from critics as well as fellow musicians over the years, with "Just a Friend" attracting particular acclaim. The 2006 hip-hop centered memoir In the Arms of Baby Hop cited the album as one of the "immaculate tapes out by February and March of 1990" (another example being 3rd Bass's The Cactus LP) influencing many. The magazine Jet named the release one of their top 20 albums of the period in their January 15, 1990 edition.

Track listing
"Dedication"- 4:02
"Check It Out"- 4:01
"The Dragon"- 4:08
"Spring Again"- 4:03
"Just a Friend"- 4:06
"She's Not Just Another Woman (Monique)"- 3:46
"Mudd Foot"- 4:16
"A Thing Named Kim"- 4:44
"Me vs. Me"- 4:47
"My Man Rich"- 3:44
"I Hear Music"- 3:01
"Biz In The Harmony"- 4:16
"Things Get a Little Easier"- 4:12

Personnel

Charts

Weekly charts

Year-end charts

Certifications

See also
Biz Markie discography
Golden age hip hop

References

1989 albums
Biz Markie albums
Cold Chillin' Records albums
Albums produced by Biz Markie